The 1996 Warrington Wolves season was the 102nd season in the club's rugby league history and the first season in the Super League. Coached by John Dorahy, the Warrington Wolves competed in Super League I and finished in 5th place. The club also reached the fifth round of the Challenge Cup.

Table

Squad
Statistics include appearances and points in the Super League and Challenge Cup.

References

External links
Warrington Wolves - Rugby League Project

Warrington Wolves seasons
Warrington Wolves